Judi is a name with multiple origins. It is a short form of the Hebrew name Judith. It is also an Arabic name referring to a mountain mentioned in the Quran. It may refer to:

Judi Andersen (born 1958), beauty pageant titleholder from Hawaii who won Miss USA 1978
Judi Ann Mason (1955–2009), American television writer, producer and playwright
Judi Bari (1949–1997), American environmentalist and labor leader, feminist, principal organizer of Earth First
Judi Barrett (born in United Kingdom) is an author of several picture books
Judi Bowker (born 1954), English television and cinema actress
Judi Brown (born 1961), American athlete who competed mainly in the 400 metre hurdles
Judi Chamberlin (1944–2010), American activist, leader, organizer, public speaker and educator in the psychiatric survivors movement
Judi Connelli (born 1947), award-winning singer and actress
Judi Dench, CH, DBE, FRSA (born 1934), English film, stage and television actress
Judi Donaghy (born 1960), American vocalist, producer and songwriter from the Twin Cities
Judi Doull (born 1938), former New Zealand cricketer
Judi Dutcher, attorney and former politician who served as the Minnesota State Auditor from 1995 to 2003
Judi Evans (born 1964), American Emmy Award-winning actress
Judi Farr, Australian theatre, film and television actor
Judi Fotheringill or Judianne Fotheringill (born 1944), American pair skater
Judi Garman (born 1944), former college softball coach
Judi Genovesi (born 1957), American ice dancer
Judi Giuliani or Judith Giuliani (born 1954), nurse, fundraiser, former managing director of Changing Our World, wife of Rudy Giuliani
Judi Lines, former British television and radio broadcaster
Judi Longfield, PC (born 1947), Canadian politician
Judi McLeod (born 1944), Canadian journalist who operates the conservative Canadian website, Canada Free Press
Judi Meredith (1936–2014), former American actress
Judi Moen (born 1954), former talk show host and news reporter for WBBM-TV in Chicago
Judi Monterey (born 1944), American model and actress
Judi Moriarty or Judith Moriarty (born 1942), American politician from Missouri
Judi Moylan (born 1944), Australian politician, Liberal member of the Australian House of Representatives
Judi Patton (born 1940), Former First Lady of Kentucky
Judi Radin (born 1950), American bridge player
Judi Richards (born 1949), Canadian pop singer and songwriter
Judi Scott or Judith Scott (born 1957), British theatrical, film and television actress
Judi Shekoni, British actress, model and television presenter who is based in Hollywood
Judi Silvano (born 1951), is a jazz singer and composer
Judi Spiers (born 1953), presenter on British radio and television
Judi Trott (born 1962), English actress
Judi Tyabji (born 1965), former British Columbia politician, wife of Gordon Wilson
Judi Warren, American basketball player

See also
Judi Mosque in Hyderabad, Andhra Pradesh, India
Judi-Dart, United States sounding rocket
Mount Judi, Şırnak Province, Southeastern Anatolia Region, Turkey
Judy (personal name)
Judy (disambiguation)
Judie

Feminine given names
Hypocorisms

da:Judi
de:Judi
id:Judi
sl:Judi